Lady Helen Diana Bridgeman (22 June 1907 – 7 May 1967) was an English socialite and fashion leader included in The Book of Beauty by Cecil Beaton.

Biography
Lady Helen Diana Bridgeman was born on 22 June 1907, the daughter of Orlando Bridgeman, 5th Earl of Bradford, and the Hon. Margaret Cecilia Bruce.

In 1922 she was the youngest bridesmaid at the wedding of Mary, Princess Royal and Countess of Harewood, daughter of George V.

On 10 February 1930 she married Sir Robert Henry Edward Abdy, 5th Baronet, son of Sir Henry Beadon Abdy, 4th Bt. and Anna Adele Coronna. They had one son, Sir Valentine Robert Duff Abdy, 6th Baronet (1937–2012) and divorced in 1962. Sir Robert Abdy was an art authority who owned antique shops in London and Paris. Lady Diana Bridgeman was also an artist; in 1920 publisher Erskine MacDonald published The Poems & Paintings of the Lady Diana Bridgeman. Her portrait posing as a painter by Harold Speed is at the Leamington Spa Gallery and Museum.

In 1933 she was included, together with her sister, in The Book of Beauty by Cecil Beaton: "Lady Abdy is a more exotic edition of her (Rosamond Pinchot n.d.r.); leonine large and pale, sullen with flowing ash air and richly curving lips. Her movements are panther like, and in many other ways she resembles Greta Garbo."

She died on 7 May 1967.

References

1907 births
1967 deaths
20th-century English painters
20th-century English poets
Helen Diana
Daughters of British earls
English socialites
English women painters
English women poets
Wives of baronets
20th-century English women